The wave–particle duality relation, often loosely referred to as the Englert–Greenberger–Yasin duality relation, or the Englert–Greenberger relation, relates the visibility, of interference fringes with the definiteness, or distinguishability, of the photons' paths in quantum optics. As an inequality:

Although it is treated as a single relation, it actually involves two separate relations, which mathematically look very similar. It was later extended to, providing an equality for the case of pure quantum states by Jaeger, Shimony, and Vaidman in 1995. This relation involves correctly guessing which of the two paths the particle would have taken, based on the initial preparation. Here  can be called the predictability. A year later Englert, in 1996,  derived a related relation dealing with experimentally acquiring knowledge of the two paths using an apparatus, as opposed to predicting the path based on initial preparation. Here  is called the distinguishability.

The significance of the relations is that they express quantitatively the complementarity of wave and particle viewpoints in double-slit experiments.  The complementarity principle in quantum mechanics, formulated by Niels Bohr, says that the wave and particle aspects of quantum objects cannot be observed at the same time.  The wave–particle duality relations makes Bohr's statement more quantitative –  an experiment can yield partial information about the wave and particle aspects of a photon simultaneously, but the more information a particular experiment gives about one, the less it will give about the other.  The predictability  which expresses the degree of probability with which path of the particle can be correctly guessed, and the distinguishability  which is the degree to which one can experimentally acquire information about the path of the particle, are measures of the particle information, while the visibility of the fringes  is a measure of the wave information.  The relations shows that they are inversely related, as one goes up, the other goes down.

The mathematics of two-slit diffraction

This section reviews the mathematical formulation of the double-slit experiment.  The formulation is in terms of the diffraction and interference of waves. The culmination of the development is a presentation of two numbers that characterizes the visibility of the interference fringes in the experiment, linked together as the Englert–Greenberger duality relation.  The next section will discuss the orthodox quantum mechanical interpretation of the duality relation in terms of wave–particle duality.  Of this experiment, Richard Feynman once said that it "has in it the heart of quantum mechanics. In reality it contains the only mystery."

The wave function in the Young double-aperture experiment can be written as

The function

The single-hole wave-function is taken to be that of Fraunhofer diffraction; the pinhole shape is irrelevant, and the pinholes are considered to be idealized. The wave is taken to have a fixed incident momentum :

where  is the radial distance from the pinhole.

To distinguish which pinhole a photon passed through, one needs some measure of the distinguishability between pinholes. Such a measure is given by

Since the Born probability measure is given by

and

then we get:

In the far-field of the two pinholes the two waves interfere and produce fringes. The intensity of the interference pattern at a point y in the focal plane is given by

The angle α from the horizontal is given by  where  is the distance between the aperture screen and the far field analysis plane. If a lens is used to observe the fringes in the rear focal plane, the angle is given by  where  is the focal length of the lens.

The visibility of the fringes is defined by

where  and  denote the maximum and minimum intensity of the fringes respectively.  By the rules of constructive and destructive interference we have

Equivalently, this can be written as

And hence we get, for a single photon in a pure quantum state, the duality relation

There are two extremal cases with a straightforward intuitive interpretation: In a single hole experiment, the fringe visibility is zero (as there are no fringes). That is,  but  since we know (by definition) which hole the photon passed through. Hence in both these extremal cases we also have .

The above presentation was limited to a pure quantum state. More generally, for a mixture of quantum states, one will have

For the remainder of the development, we assume the light source is a laser, so that we can assume  holds, following from the coherence properties of laser light.

Complementarity
The mathematical discussion presented above does not require quantum mechanics at its heart. In particular, the derivation is essentially valid for waves of any sort. With slight modifications to account for the squaring of amplitudes, the derivation could be applied to, for example, sound waves or water waves in a ripple tank.

For the relation to be a precise formulation of Bohr complementarity, one must introduce wave–particle duality in the discussion. This means one must consider both wave and particle behavior of light on an equal footing. Wave–particle duality implies that one must A) use the unitary evolution of the wave before the observation and B) consider the particle aspect after the detection (this is called the Heisenberg–von Neumann collapse postulate). Indeed, since one could only observe the photon in one point of space (a photon can not be absorbed twice) this implies that the meaning of the wave function is essentially statistical and cannot be confused with a classical wave (such as those that occur in air or water).

In this context the direct observation of a photon in the aperture plane precludes the following recording of the same photon in the focal plane (F). Reciprocally the observation in (F) means that we did not absorb the photon before. If both holes are open this implies that we don't know where we would have detected the photon in the aperture plane.  defines thus the predictability of the two holes A and B.

A maximal value of predictability  means that only one hole (say A) is open. If now we detect the photon at (F), we know that that photon would  have been detected in A necessarily. Conversely,  means that both holes are open and play a symmetric role.

Similarly, if  then  and this means that a statistical accumulation of photons at (F) builds up an interference
pattern with maximal visibility. Conversely,  implies  and thus, no fringes appear after a statistical recording of several photons.

The above treatment formalizes wave particle duality for the double-slit experiment.

See also
 Afshar experiment
 Quantum entanglement
 Quantum indeterminacy

References and notes

Further reading
  Demonstrates that quantum interference effects are destroyed by irreversible object-apparatus correlations ("measurement"), not by Heisenberg's uncertainty principle itself. See also

External links

Quantum optics